Belarus (Беларусь) is a Belarusian manufacturer of upright pianos, founded in 1935 in Belarus (then the Soviet Union). It was owned by the joint-stock company "Muzinstrument - Borisov". It is also known as the piano manufactures Sängler & Söhne, Schubert and Wieler pianos.

In 2018, the company that produced pianos was declared bankrupt. As of 2020, the liquidation of the company was in progress and the company found new ownership in July.

In 2019 the revived company delivered almost 50 Grand Pianos to art schools and cultural centers of the Mogilev region by state orders, with 669 instruments produced in total during that year. In the second half of 2020 the Minsk factory reached 464 instruments it is reported, with the government ordered 5 year plan the production is to be reach at 2500 instruments.

See also

List of piano brand names

References

External links
 Muzinstrument - Borisov company website 
 Piano Belarus modern company website in Russian

Belarusian brands
Musical instrument manufacturing companies of Belarus
Piano manufacturing companies
Manufacturing companies established in 1935
1935 establishments in the Soviet Union
Musical instrument manufacturing companies of the Soviet Union